Kelly Perine (born March 23, 1969) is an American television actor, writer, director, producer, and comedian. Perine attended Lake Forest Academy near Chicago, Illinois, where he studied stage acting. He spent his undergraduate years at Pomona College in Claremont, California majoring in film studies, where he graduated in 1991. After graduating, he studied at the University of California, Irvine where he received his master's degree in Drama seven years later.

Career
Perine is a veteran of over 25 years in Hollywood. Much of his work have been sitcoms or otherwise comedic in nature. Perine had regular roles in Between Brothers as weatherman Dustin "Dusty" Q. Canyon, Kelly Peterson on the fifth and final season of The Parent 'Hood, and used car salesman Duane Odell Knox  in One on One from seasons 1 to 4, not returning for season 5. He starred in the MyNetworkTV comedy Under One Roof (2008−09), where he played Winston Hill opposite Flavor Flav.

His film work includes portraying Kurt in comedy Trial and Error (1997) and Keene in horror film Bram Stoker's Legend of the Mummy (1998). Perine has also made appearances in numerous independent films like Convincing Clooney where he played the role of Disco.

During the 2010s, Perine began acting in several Nickelodeon productions, as Uncle Charlie in Christmas film Santa Hunters and the recurring role of Principal Platt on short-lived comedic series Legendary Dudas. He then portrayed Sir Gareth in the series Knight Squad. Perine is currently in pre-production for the feature film Downward Hiro, which he wrote and is starring in. The film is based on the award-winning short of the same name, which won a number of festival awards. He has also penned a baseball comedy called Run Down Mongoose, which follows a washed up Dodger scout that travels to the Dominican Republic to sign an up-and-coming player.

Perine also has a number of unscripted shows such as From Scratch, and Finish The Fridge, which are travel/lifestyle shows. He has appeared in many television commercials, and has had bit parts in numerous sitcoms, including 21 Jump Street, Seinfeld, The Drew Carey Show, Coach, Mad About You, Living Single, Hangin' with Mr. Cooper, Malcolm & Eddie, The Steve Harvey Show, The Hughleys, How I Met Your Mother, True Jackson, VP, Austin & Ally and The Bernie Mac Show.

Filmography

Film and TV Movies

Television

References

External links

1969 births
Living people
African-American male actors
American male television actors
Lake Forest Academy alumni
Pomona College alumni
University of California, Irvine alumni
African-American male comedians
American male comedians
Comedians from California
21st-century American comedians
21st-century African-American people
20th-century African-American people